Chernyshkovsky (masculine), Chernyshkovskaya (feminine), or Chernyshkovskoye (neuter) may refer to:
Chernyshkovsky District, a district of Volgograd Oblast, Russia
Chernyshkovsky (urban-type settlement), an urban locality (a work settlement) in Chernyshkovsky District of Volgograd Oblast, Russia